Kenn is a village and civil parish situated in Devon, England, approximately 5 miles to the south of Exeter.  It lies in the district of Teignbridge, and at the 2001 census had a population of 968.

It has a pub and a Parish Church, built of Heavitree stone.

References

External links

Villages in Devon